"Manta Ray" is an original song composed by J. Ralph and Anohni and performed by Anohni. The song was released as the lead single from the soundtrack album of 2015 documentary Racing Extinction written by Anohni.

"Manta Ray" received critical acclaim and was nominated for Academy Award for Best Original Song at 88th Academy Awards for Anohni and J. Ralph.

Composition
The lyrics are written and sung by singer Anohni, with the melody and music composed by J. Ralph who also produced the recording. The song was inspired by the mating call of the last individual survivor of the now extinct Kauaʻi ʻōʻō. The music video features magnifications of various marine microorganisms.

Awards
 2016: Academy Award for Best Original Song - nominated

References

External links
 
 Manta Ray at Oscars.org  
 

2015 singles
2015 songs
Songs written by Anohni
Environmental songs